Bruno Postiglioni (born 8 April 1987 in La Plata) is an Argentine rugby union player. He plays as a prop and as a hooker.

Postiglioni currently plays for Beauvais Rugby Club.

He counts 18 caps for Argentina, since his debut at 20 May 2012, in the 40–5 win over Uruguay, in Santiago, for the South American Rugby Championship. He has currently 1 try scored, and 5 points on aggregate.

Postiglioni was called for the 2012 Rugby Championship, but only made his debut in the competition in 2014.

References

External links

1987 births
Living people
Argentine rugby union players
Argentina international rugby union players
La Plata Rugby Club players
Pampas XV players
Rugby union props
Rugby union hookers
Sportspeople from La Plata